Cedar Flat is a census-designated place (CDP) in eastern Placer County, California, United States. It is located on the northwest shore of Lake Tahoe, between Carnelian Bay to the northeast and Dollar Point to the southwest. It was first listed as a CDP prior to the 2020 census.

Demographics

References 

Census-designated places in Placer County, California
Census-designated places in California